Faichuk (also Faichuuk, Tol, or the Western Islands) are a group of four islands separated from one another by narrow canals in the western part of Truk Lagoon, Chuuk, Micronesia. The tightly knit islands are considered as one for statistical and administrative purposes.

The islands are Paata (Pata), Polle, Wonei (Onei), and Tol (these four, because of their proximity, are sometimes collectively subsumed under the island name Tol), Eot, Fanapanges, Romanum and Udot. Their aggregate area is 41.90 or 49.63 km2, according to different sources. The population is 16,000. The islands are mostly hilly and peak at 443 meters above sea level (Mount Winipot on Tol Island). This group of islands claims again (2002) the status of a federated state after a first attempt refused by the Micronesian president around 1985.

References

External links
 Directory of the islands of Micronesia

Islands of Chuuk State
Municipalities of Chuuk State